The Sud Ladies Cup (officially the Sud Ladies Cup – Tournoi Maurice Revello) is a women's football tournament. The tournament was named after Maurice Revello, who started the Toulon Tournament in 1967 and died in 2016. It is held in the region of Provence-Alpes-Côte d'Azur. Similar to the Toulon Tournament, the tournament is contested by under-20 national teams. In the 2018 tournament, all matches were played in Salon-de-Provence.

United States won the first Tournament defeating Germany, Haiti and France.

Results

Notes

Statistics

Performances by countries

Performances by confederations

Awards

See also
Toulon Tournament

References

External links
Official site

 
International association football competitions hosted by France
Under-21 association football
Sport in Bouches-du-Rhône